Theodore W. Greig (March 13, 1843 – November 17, 1893) was a Union Army soldier in the American Civil War who received the U.S. military's highest decoration, the Medal of Honor.

Greig was born in New York on March 13, 1843. He was awarded the Medal of Honor for extraordinary heroism shown at the Battle of Antietam on September 17, 1862, while serving as a Second Lieutenant with Company C, 61st New York Volunteer Infantry Regiment. His Medal of Honor was issued on February 10, 1887.

Greig died at the age of 50 on November 17, 1893, and was buried at Woodlawn Cemetery in Bronx, New York.

Medal of Honor citation

References

External links

1843 births
1893 deaths
Burials in New York (state)
People of New York (state) in the American Civil War
Union Army officers
United States Army Medal of Honor recipients
American Civil War recipients of the Medal of Honor